Nader Engheta (born 1955 in Tehran) is an Iranian-American scientist. He has made pioneering contributions to the fields of metamaterials, transformation optics, plasmonic optics, nanophotonics, graphene photonics, nano-materials, nanoscale optics, nano-antennas and miniaturized antennas, physics and reverse-engineering of polarization vision in nature, bio-inspired optical imaging, fractional paradigm in electrodynamics, and electromagnetics and microwaves.

Background 
After earning a B.S. degree from the school of engineering (Daneshkadeh-e-Fanni) of the University of Tehran, he left for the United States in the summer of 1978 and earned his Masters and PhD  degrees from the Caltech.

He is one of the original pioneers of the field of modern metamaterials, and is the originator of the fields of near-zero-index metamaterials, plasmonic cloaking and optical nano circuitry (optical metatronics,).

His metamaterial-based optical nano circuitry, in which properly designed nano structures function as "lumped' optical circuit elements such as optical capacitors, optical inductors and optical resistors.  These are the building blocks for the metatronic circuits operating with light.  This concept has been recently verified and realized experimentally by him and his research group at the University of Pennsylvania.  This provides a new circuit paradigm for information processing at the nanoscale.

His near-zero-index structures exhibit unique properties in light-matter interaction that have provided exciting possibilities in nanophotonics.

His plasmonic cloaking ideas have led to new methods in stealth physics.

He and his group have developed several areas and concepts in the fields of metamaterials and plasmonic optics, including, (1) ‘extreme-parameter metamaterials’ and 'epsilon-near-zero (ENZ) metamaterials'; (2) the concept of Omega structures, as one of the building blocks of structured materials,; (3) ultrathin cavities and waveguides, with sizes beyond diffraction limits, providing possibilities for unprecedented miniaturization of devices; (4) supercoupling phenomena between waveguides using low-permittivity ENZ metamaterials,; (5) extended Purcell effects in nano-optics using the ENZ phenomena, in which enhanced photon density of states occurs in a relatively large area with essentially uniform phase; (6) far-field subwavelength imaging lens based on ENZ hyperbolic metamaterials; (7) scattering-cancellation-based plasmonic cloaking and transparency,; (8) merging the field of graphene with the field of metamaterials and plasmonic optics in infrared regime, providing the roadmaps for one-atom-thick optical devices and one-atom-thick information processing,; (9) microwave artificial chirality; (10) “signal-processing” metamaterials and “meta-machine”, and (11) “digital” metamaterials.

He is currently the H. Nedwill Ramsey Professor at the University of Pennsylvania, Philadelphia, Pennsylvania, USA, affiliated with the departments of Electrical and Systems Engineering, Bioengineering, materials science and engineering, and Physics and Astronomy.

Awards and honors 
Professor Engheta has received the following honors and awards:
Franklin Medal in Electrical Engineering (2023)
Hermann Anton Haus Lecture, MIT (April 13, 2022)
Isaac Newton Medal (2020)
 Max Born Award (2020)
 Canadian Academy of Engineering, International Fellow (2019)
Ellis Island Medal of Honor from the Ellis Island Honors Society (2019)
Pioneer Award in Nanotechnology from IEEE Nanotechnology Council (2018)
 Highly Cited Researcher (Clarivate Analytics, Top 1% Researcher most cited) (2017 & 2018)
 William Streifer Scientific Achievement Award from IEEE Photonics Society (2017)
 Beacon of Photonics Industry Award from Photonics Media (2017)
 Honorary Doctorate from National Technical University Kharkov Polytechnic Institute (2017)
 Honorary Doctorate from University of Stuttgart, Germany (2016)
 Honorary Doctorate in Technology from Aalto University in Finland (2016)
 SPIE Gold Medal (2015) 
 Vannevar Bush Faculty Fellow Award from the US Department of Defense (2015)
 Distinguished Achievement Award from the IEEE Antennas and Propagation Society (2015)
 Wheatstone Lecture in King's College London (2015)
 Balthasar van der Pol Gold Medal from URSI (International Union of Radio Science) (2014)
 Inaugural SINA Award in Engineering (SINA: "Spirit of Iranian Noted Achiever") (2013)
 Benjamin Franklin Key Award (2013)
 IEEE Electromagnetics Award (2012)
 Fellow of the Institute of Physics (UK) (2020)
 Fellow of the Union Radio-Scientifique Internationale (URSI: International Union of Radio Science) (since 2017)
 Fellow of the US National Academy of Inventors (NAI) (2015)
 Fellow of the Materials Research Society (MRS) (since 2015)
 Fellow of the SPIE- The International Society for Optical Engineering (since 2011)
 Fellow of the American Association for the Advancement of Science (AAAS) (since 2010)
 Fellow of the American Physical Society (APS) (since November 2008)
 Fellow of the Optical Society of America (OSA) (since March 1999)
 Fellow of the Institute of Electrical and Electronics Engineers IEEE (since January 1996)
 Recipient of the George H. Heilmeier Faculty Award 2008 for Excellence in Research
 In Scientific American Magazine List of 50 Leaders in Science and Technology, 2006 
 Endowed Scholarly H. Nedwill Ramsey Professorship, U. of Pennsylvania, January 2005 – present
 IEEE Third Millennium Medal
 Guggenheim Fellowship (1999)
 UPS Foundation Distinguished Educator term Chair
 Fulbright Naples Chair Award (1998)
 S. Reid Warren Jr. Award (two times: 1993 and 2001)
 IEEE Antennas and Propagation Society (AP-S) Distinguished Lecturer for 1997–1999
 W. M. Keck Foundation's Engineering Teaching Excellence Award (1995)
 Christian F. and Mary R. Lindback Foundation Award (1994)
 NSF Presidential Young Investigator (PYI) Award (1989)
 Frequent plenary and keynote speaker at many conferences

Books

See also 
 Iranian science

References

External links 
 Dr. Nader Engheta in Scientific American 50 list
 For Nader Engheta's Recent Research Papers, see https://www.seas.upenn.edu/~engheta/publications-intro-page.htm
 For Press Releases and News Media Reports on some of Nader Engheta's Research, see https://www.seas.upenn.edu/~engheta/news-1.htm

Iranian electrical engineers
American people of Iranian descent
People from Tehran
1955 births
Living people
Metamaterials scientists
University of Pennsylvania faculty
California Institute of Technology alumni
University of Tehran alumni
Fellows of the American Association for the Advancement of Science
Fellows of the American Physical Society
Fellows of Optica (society)
Fellow Members of the IEEE
Iranian expatriate academics
21st-century American engineers
Optical engineers